Pig is a 2011 American science fiction film written and directed by Henry Barrial and starring Rudolf Martin.

Cast

 Heather Ankeny as Isabel
 Kurt Boesen as Cabbie
 Ines Dali as Anouk
 Keith Diamond as Manny Elder
 Deborah Dir as Woman 3
 Clifford Elliot as Matriarch's Husband
 Patrick Fabian as Internist
 Jared Fisher as Down Syndrome Man
 Marijke Fisher as The Matriarch
 Billy Ray Gallion as Isabel's Husband
 Brian Lally as Motel Clerk
 Sarah Danielle Madison as Woman 2
 Rudolf Martin as Man
 Matt Miller as C.E.O.
 Jennifer Moller as Anouk's sister
 Karen S. Peterson as Karla Ernst
 Ringo Peterson as Max Ernst
 Glen Powell as Johnny the Teacher
 Todd Ray as Freak Show Man
 Pamela Salem as Narrator
 Steve Tom as Doctor
 Leyna Weber as Natalie

Release
Pig debuted on 16 April 2011 at the Nashville Film Festival and opened in other film festivals on the dates given below.

References

External links
 
 

2011 films
American science fiction films
Films about amnesia
2010s English-language films
2010s American films